Samantha Epasinghe (11 April 1967 – 3 October 2021), also known as Samantha Diyasena Liyanage, was an actress in Sri Lankan cinema, theatre and television.

Career 
Epasinghe began her acting career with the play 'Muhuda Mudra' and was joined on the small screen by Lucien Bulathsinhala and Bandula Vithanage. She acted in teledramas and few films in her career. She won the Best Emerging Award at the 21st Sarasaviya Awards in 1993 for her performance in the film Rajek Wage Puthek (1992).

Filmography 

 1990 - Walavuve Hanu
 1991 - Kelimadala
 1992 - Sathya
 1992 - Sayanaye Shihinaya
 1992 - Rajek Wage Puthek
 1994 - Vijaya Geetha
 1996 - Thunweni Aha
 1996 - Loku Duwa
 1996 - Sihina Vimane Raja Kumari
 1997 - Puthuni Mata Wasana
 1997 - Raththaran Minihek
 2008 - Ai Oba Thaniwela

Death 
She died on 3 October 2021, at the age of 54 from COVID-19. She underwent treatment at the Horona Base Hospital after being diagnosed with  COVID-19 and illness.

See also 
 List of Sri Lankan actors

References

External links 
 

1967 births
2021 deaths
Place of birth missing
Sinhalese actresses
Sri Lankan film actresses
Sri Lankan stage actresses
Sri Lankan television actresses
20th-century Sri Lankan actresses
21st-century Sri Lankan actresses
Sri Lankan Roman Catholics

Deaths from the COVID-19 pandemic in Sri Lanka